Sol Press was an American publishing company that focused on localizing Japanese visual novels, light novels, and manga. Located in Orange County, California, it was formed in 2017. In October 2021, it was prohibited from doing business in the state of California for non-payment of taxes.

The company had licensed nine visual novels, nine light novels, and six manga for release on the Steam and Kadokawa's BookWalker platforms.

History
Sol Press was founded in February 2017 by Michael Valdez, who was unhappy with the slow translation processes and products of other video game localization companies. For the company's titles, Valdez emphasized the importance of not charging players for patches as he believed it was unnecessary and an unpopular business tactic. Although Sol Press-licensed visual novels are censored when released on Steam, free patches to receive adult content in the original games are downloadable on external websites.

In September 2017, Sol Press created a Kickstarter fundraiser to support the localization of the Haikuo Soft visual novel/eroge Sakura Sakura. Despite Sakura Sakura age and obscurity, Sol Press elected to pick up the game following positive feedback from the staff. Funding for the Kickstarter was completed a month later. It was released on November 19, 2018, on Steam. A second Haikuo Soft visual novel, Yotsunoha, saw a Western release on July 13, 2019, on Sol Press' website after it was denied publishing by Steam.

Joined by MiKandi Japan, another campaign was launched on December 1, 2017, to fund the Laplacian VN Newton and the Apple Tree. After just three days, it had already reached its goal of $31,200. It was released on August 15. Later in the year, DareSora: Tears for an Unknown Sky was localized and released on September 14.

In April 2018, it began expansion into licensing light novels with the books Strongest Gamer – Let's Play in Another World and Battle Divas – The Incorruptible Battle Blossom Princess. The two were digitally released on April 30. At Kumoricon 2018 in Oregon, Sol Press announced the creation of Project Hyourin, a digital distribution client for works licensed by the company. It also formed an alliance with Japanese game publisher Entergram to release visual novels on consoles in North America.

On May 24, 2019, Sol Press announced a partnership with Kadokawa Corporation to release light novels and manga on Kadokawa's BookWalker platform.

The company was forfeited by the California FTB for failure to pay taxes in late October 2021. Citing requests from the original Japanese publishers, BookWalker removed series licensed by Sol Press on February 21, 2022.

Licensed works

Visual novels

Light novels

Manga

Notes

References

External links
 
 

Companies based in Los Angeles
Defunct comics and manga publishing companies
Defunct video game companies of the United States
Video game publishers
2017 establishments in California
2021 disestablishments in California